Musefiu Olasunkanmi Ashiru (born 26 June 1994) is a Nigerian professional footballer who plays as a winger. He previously played in Nigeria, Denmark and Slovakia for FC Ebedei, FC Midtjylland, Ringkøbing IF, Skive IK, Tatran Prešov and Dunajská Streda.

Career
Ashiru started his career with FC Ebedei, before signing for FC Midtjylland. In June 2013 he signed a new one-year contract with the club, which was extended in January 2014 by a further three years. In February 2015, Ashiru was loaned out to Ringkøbing IF until the summer of 2015. He also spent a loan spell at Skive IK. After a spell in Slovakia with Tatran Prešov, he signed a long-term contract with Czech club Zbrojovka Brno in December 2016. In February 2019, he signed for Spartak Trnava.

Honours
Spartak Trnava
 Slovak Cup: 2018–19

References

1994 births
Living people
Nigerian footballers
F.C. Ebedei players
FC Midtjylland players
Ringkøbing IF players
Skive IK players
1. FC Tatran Prešov players
FC DAC 1904 Dunajská Streda players
FC Zbrojovka Brno players
FC Spartak Trnava players
Danish Superliga players
Danish 1st Division players
Slovak Super Liga players
Association football wingers
Nigerian expatriate footballers
Nigerian expatriate sportspeople in Denmark
Expatriate men's footballers in Denmark
Nigerian expatriate sportspeople in Slovakia
Expatriate footballers in Slovakia
Nigerian expatriate sportspeople in the Czech Republic
Expatriate footballers in the Czech Republic